Ian C. Johnston (born September 27, 1938) is a Canadian author and translator, a retired university-college instructor and a professor emeritus at Vancouver Island University.

Early life and education 
Johnston was born in Valparaíso, Chile, to Dorothy and Kenneth Johnston. He attended the University of Toronto Schools during his high school years. At the post-secondary level, he was educated at McGill University, Montreal (BSC in Geology and Chemistry 1959); at the University of Bristol (BA in English and Greek, 1968); and at the University of Toronto (MA in English, 1969).

He holds certificates from Ontario College of Education, Heidelberg University, and the Jarvis School of Welding.

Teaching career 
Johnston taught high-school physics and chemistry at Upper Canada College, Toronto (1959–60) and high-school biology, mathematics, and Latin at Port Perry High School, Port Perry, Ontario (1961-1963). From 1969-70 he taught undergraduate English courses at the University of British Columbia. After that he joined the faculty of the College of New Caledonia, Prince George, British Columbia, where he taught undergraduate English and Classics from 1970 to 1975. From 1975-2004 he taught at Malaspina College and Malaspina University-College, Nanaimo (now Vancouver Island University).

Publications and other work 
Johnston is the author of The Ironies of War: An Introduction to Homer's Iliad (University Press of America, 1987). He has translated classic works from Greek, Latin, German, and French. Several of these translated works have been published by Broadview Press, including his translation of Kafka's The Metamorphosis, and/or produced as audiobooks by Naxos Audio Books in the UK.

A number of his translations have also been issued in book form by Richer Resources Publications. Johnston has posted over 75 essays and lectures on various literary topics on his website, as well as workbooks on essay writing, grammar, statistics, and the history of science.

Johnston has also written Essays and Arguments: A Handbook for Writing Student Essays, released by Broadview Press in 2015.

Translations by Ian Johnston 
 Aeschylus, Oresteia
 Aeschylus, Persians
 Aeschylus, Prometheus Bound
 Aeschylus, Seven Against Thebes
 Aeschylus, Suppliant Women
 Aristophanes, Birds
 Aristophanes, Clouds
 Aristophanes, Frogs
 Aristophanes, Knights
 Aristophanes, Lysistrata
 Aristophanes, Peace
 Aristotle, Nicomachean Ethics (Abridged)
 Cuvier, On the Revolutionary Upheavals on the Surface of the Earth
 Diderot, D’Alembert's Dream 
 Diderot, Rameau's Nephew
 Descartes, Discourse on Method 
 Descartes, Meditations on First Philosophy 
 Euripides, Bacchae
 Euripides, Electra
 Euripides, Medea
 Euripides, Orestes
 Homer, Iliad (complete and abridged)
 Homer, Odyssey (complete and abridged)
 Homer, The Odyssey: Selections (Broadview Edition 2019)
 Kafka, Metamorphosis, Hunger Artist, In the Penal Colony, and Other Stories
 Kafka, The Metamorphosis and Other Stories (Broadview Edition 2015)
 Kant, On Perpetual Peace
 Kant, Universal Natural History and Theory of the Heavens
 Lamarck, Zoological Philosophy, Volume I
 Lucretius, The Nature of Things
 Nietzsche, Beyond Good and Evil
 Nietzsche, Birth of Tragedy
 Nietzsche, Genealogy of Morals
 Nietzsche, On the Use and Abuse of History for Life
 Ovid, Metamorphoses
 Rousseau, On the Sciences and the Arts
 Rousseau, On the Origin of Inequality
 Rousseau, Social Contract
 Sophocles, Ajax
 Sophocles, Antigone
 Sophocles, Oedipus at Colonus
 Sophocles, Oedipus the King
 Sophocles, Philoctetes
 Wedekind, Castle Wetterstein (Broadview Edition 2019)

Personal life 
Johnson lives in Nanaimo, British Columbia, Canada, with his wife, Colleen Johnston.

References

External links 

1938 births
Academic staff of Vancouver Island University
Canadian non-fiction writers
Canadian translators
Chilean emigrants to Canada
Chilean people of British descent
Living people
McGill University Faculty of Science alumni
People from Valparaíso
Chilean non-fiction writers
Translators of Homer
Translators of Friedrich Nietzsche
Male non-fiction writers